Emily Mary Bowdler Sharpe, born on 11 December 1868, was an English entomologist, colourist and illustrator

Emily Mary Bowdler Sharpe was the eldest of ten daughters of Richard Bowdler Sharpe (1847–1909) and Emily Eliza Sharpe (née Burrows; 1842–1928). She had 11 sisters and one brother who died in infancy. 

She learned her craft from her father and initially she worked as a colourist on her father's books before dedicating herself to the study of butterflies. She worked throughout her life on butterflies, and described many new species.

Selected works
Descriptions of new Species of East-African Butterflies Annals and Magazine of Natural History(6) 5 (28) : 335-336 (1890) 
Descriptions of some new Species of Lepidoptera collected by Mr. Herbert Ward at Bangala, on the Congo Ann. Mag. Nat. Hist. (6) 7 (37) : 130-135 (1891)
Descriptions of New Butterflies collected by Mr. F. J. Jackson, F.Z.S:, in British East Africa, during his recent Expedition. - Part I & II Proceedings of the Zoological Society of London 1891 : 187–194, pl. 16-17 633–638, pl. 48. (1891, 1892) 
Further Descriptions of Butterflies and Moths collected by Mr. F. J. Jackson in Eastern Africa Annals and Magazine of Natural History. (6) 5 (30) : 440-443 (1890)
A List of the Lepidopterous Insects collected on the Red Sea, in the neighbourhood of Suakim. Proceedings of the Zoological Society of London 1897(3):775-777 (1897)
On a collection of lepidopterous insects from San Domingo. With field notes by the collector, Dr. Cuthbert Christy - 1898(3): 362-369 (1898)
 A List of the Lepidopterous Insects collected by Mrs. Lort Phillips in Somaliland. Proceedings of the zoological Society of London 1898(3):369-372(1898)
A list of Lepidoptera collected by Dr. Cuthbert Christy in Nigeria Entomologist 35 : 65–68, 101-107 (1902)
On new species of Butterflies from Equatorial Africa Entomologist 37 : 131-134 (1904)
Descriptions of new Lepidoptera from Equatorial Africa Entomologist 37 : 181-183 (1904)
Description of two new species belonging to the family Nymphalidae Entomologist 40 : 155-156 (1907)
A monograph of the genus Teracolus London, L. Reeve & Co.(1914)

References

English lepidopterists
Women entomologists

1869 births
1928 deaths